A. M. Zahiruddin Khan (1936 – 29 March 2005) was a Bangladeshi politician and industrialist. He served as a Jatiya Sangsad member representing the Chittagong-6 constituency during 1979–1982.

Early life 
Khan was the eldest son of Abul Kashem Khan, a  minister in the central cabinet of the then Pakistan. Foreign minister Morshed Khan was his cousin and brother-in-law. He studied at St. Paul's School in Darjeeling, India, later on at Aitchison College in Lahore, Pakistan.

Career 
In 1958, Khan became the managing director of A K Khan & Company and later the chairman in 1991. He was also the founding Chairman of AKTEL and Chairman of COATS Bangladesh, Bengal Fisheries Ltd. He was the President of Chittagong Chamber of Commerce & Industry (CCCI) from two consecutive terms. In 1977 he was elected President of Federation of Bangladesh Chamber of Commerce & Industry (FBCCI).  As President of FBCCI, he initiated the formation of Islamic Chambers of Commerce & Industry. He was also elected Chairman of the Working Group for drafting of the Islamic Chamber of Commerce & Industry Constitution in the Istanbul Conference in 1977.  He also participated in the International Labour Organization (ILO) conference in Geneva in 1975 as representative of Bangladesh Employers. He was also chairman of All Pakistan Textile Mills Association (East Zone) from 1969 to 1971, founder chairman of Bangladesh Textile Mills Association (BTMA), founder director of Investment Corporation of Bangladesh (ICB) and Director of Sadharan Bima Corporation.  He also served as Chairman of Sonali Bank.

Khan joined politics in 1978 and was also elected Member of Parliament (MP) in 1979 from Bangladesh Nationalist Party (BNP) led by President Ziaur Rahman. He became a member of Begum Khaleda Zia's cabinet in 1991 as the planning minister and later as industries minister.

References

External links
 A. M. Zahiruddin Khan at A.K. Khan & Company Ltd official website
 Zahiruddin Khan - A memorial volume

1936 births
2005 deaths
Bangladesh Nationalist Party politicians
2nd Jatiya Sangsad members
Planning ministers of Bangladesh
Industries ministers of Bangladesh